El Pollo Loco (Spanish for "The Crazy Chicken") is the name of two independent restaurant chains that specialize in Mexican-style grilled chicken. Both were founded by Juan Francisco Ochoa. He established the first El Pollo Loco restaurant in Guasave, Sinaloa, Mexico in 1974. Ochoa then expanded his chain into the United States in 1980. He later sold his U.S. restaurants in 1983 while keeping the ones in Mexico. The two companies have since occupied non-overlapping global territories and have offered different fare. Flagstar, El Pollo Loco's parent company at the time, then filed for Chapter 11 bankruptcy on July 12, 1997.

 El Pollo Loco (Mexico) is the chain still owned by Ochoa's family and operates over 50 locations within Mexico.
 El Pollo Loco (United States) operates about 500 company-owned and franchised restaurants primarily in the Southwestern United States. Since 2014, the U.S.-based company has been publicly traded on the NASDAQ stock exchange under the ticker LOCO.

See also
 List of fast-food chicken restaurants

References

External links
 
 

Fast-food Mexican restaurants
Fast casual restaurants
Fast-food poultry restaurants
Broad-concept articles
Companies that filed for Chapter 11 bankruptcy in 1997